Downgate is a hamlet in east Cornwall, England. It is between Pensilva and Upton Cross. According to the Post Office the 2011 census population was included in the civil parish of Linkinhorne.

References

Hamlets in Cornwall